Yao Jude (born 1957) is a Chinese actor. He is now a member of China Artist Association. He has won the Plum Blossom Prize.

Biography
Yao was born in Gai County, Yingkou, Liaoning in 1957. After graduating from Shenyang Conservatory of Music he became an actor.

Filmography

Television

Film

Awards
 Plum Blossom Prize

References

1957 births
People from Yingkou
Shenyang Conservatory of Music alumni
Male actors from Liaoning
Living people
Chinese male film actors
Chinese male television actors